The Confidence-Man: His Masquerade, first published in New York on April Fool's Day 1857, is the ninth book and final novel by American writer Herman Melville. The book was published on the exact day of the novel's setting. 

Centered on the title character, The Confidence-Man portrays a group of steamboat passengers. Their interlocking stories are told as they travel the Mississippi River toward New Orleans. The narrative structure is reminiscent of The Canterbury Tales (1392). Scholar Robert Milder notes: "Long mistaken for a flawed novel, the book is now admired as a masterpiece of irony and control, although it continues to resist interpretive consensus."

Analysis

The novel's title refers to its central character, an ambiguous figure. He sneaks aboard a Mississippi steamboat on April Fool's Day. This stranger attempts to test the confidence of the passengers. Their varied reactions constitute the bulk of the text. Each person, including the reader, is forced to confront the placement of his trust.

The novel is written as cultural satire, allegory, and metaphysical treatise, dealing with themes of sincerity, identity, morality, religiosity, economic materialism, irony, and cynicism. Many readers place The Confidence-Man alongside Melville's Moby-Dick and "Bartleby, the Scrivener" as a precursor to 20th-century literary pre-occupations with nihilism, existentialism, and absurdism.

The work includes satires of 19th-century literary figures: Mark Winsome is based on Ralph Waldo Emerson, while his "practical disciple" Egbert is Henry David Thoreau; Charlie Noble is based on Nathaniel Hawthorne; and a beggar in the story was inspired by Edgar Allan Poe.

The Confidence-Man was probably inspired by the case of William Thompson, a con artist active in New York City in the late 1840s.

Character list
 The Mute – A man in cream colors, a tossed look, a linty fair cheek, downy chin, flaxen hair. Looks like a stranger. He writes on a slate an allusion to 1 Corinthians 13.
 The Barber – Puts up a sign "No Trust". The Cosmopolitan convinces him to remove the sign, and trust that for one week, he will pay for all unpaid services.
 Guinea, an African-American crippled beggar – Catches coins with his mouth. Says he sleeps on the streets. After his honesty is questioned, he gives a list of people who can vouch for him: The man with the weed in his hat, the man in a grey suit, the transfer agent, the herb-doctor, the Cosmopolitan, The Agent of the Philosophical Intelligence Office and Thomas Fry, all of these are main characters potentially attempting to deceive each other.
 A purple faced drover – Gets the initial information about Guinea.
 The man with the wooden leg – Casts doubt on whether Guinea is a cripple.
 A country Merchant, Mr. Henry Roberts – A man of generous acts. He is the first to be pushed into believing he used to know Mr. John Ringman, but a memory lapse made him forget. He gives him money, then follows the advice to buy stock at the Black Rapids Coal Company. He later discusses pity with its president, drinks too much, then confesses 'charity and hope' are mere dreams. 
 A Young Episcopal Clergyman – Discusses the genuineness of Guinea, "frozen in cold charity" then "thawed into fluidity" and kind words.
 A Methodist minister – Very martial looking, accuses the man with the wooden leg of being a 'reprobate and a Canada Thistle'.
 A gruff boatman – Asks Guinea to go find anybody to vouch for (Guinea).
 John Ringman, the Man with the Weed – He tries to convince the country merchant, Mr. Roberts, they are acquainted, but Robert's memory faltered. He asks for money, then recommends buying stock at the Black Rapids Coal Company. He is said to be looking for money to be able to go join his daughter after a disastrous divorce left him penniless. He tries to convince the sophomore to throw Tacitus away because it is too depressive. He is reading Mark Akenside's "The Pleasures of the Imagination".
 The sophomore – A young student reading Tacitus to read the gossip. Later, he wants to buy stock from the Black Rapids Coal Company. It turns out he likes "prosperous fellows" and despises "gloomy men".
 A Well-to-do Gentleman – dressed in ruby colored velvet, has a ruby colored cheek. After he is accosted by the man in the gray suit, expresses annoyance at all the beggars allowed on the ferry.
 The Man in a Gray Suit – This man accosts people for donations to a Widow and Orphan Asylum (Seminoles).
 The Hard-Hearted Old Gentleman – A bulky man accuses the man in a gray suit of hypocrisy.
 The Good Man – An elegantly-dressed man with white kid gloves and white hands. Melville explains he is "a good man" but not a righteous man. His hands are kept clean by having a black servant do the dirty work for him. He has a disagreement with the man in a gray suit about poverty.
 A Charitable Lady – asked to give $20 to the man in the gray suit.
 John Truman, The President and Transfer Agent for the Black Rapids Coal Company – lives on Jones street in Saint Louis.
 A somewhat elderly person in Quaker dress – spreads his poetry about confidence in one another.
 A little dried-up man – Refuses to do anything outside his habits: no wine, no games, etc.
 The Shrunken Old Miser – sickly, he is afraid of losing his last savings, yet gambles in the Merchant's scheme of tripling returns, and ends up buying boxes from the Herb-doctor, paying in Mexican pistols and not dollars.
 Goneril – The wife of John Ringman, the man with the weed. She is said to be cold-hearted, to touch other men in a sly way, to take revenge for jealousy on her daughter. During the divorce procedures, she dragged her husband to court then was awarded his money. Shortly after, she dies. 
 The sick man – The man is sick and tired of doctors offering ineffective remedies. The herb-doctor tries to convince him, with confidence, his herbs will work. After a philosophical debate about whether nature can be trusted, he agrees to try.
 The herb-doctor – Tries to sell "Omni-Balsamic-Reinvigorator" and "Samaritan Pain Dissuader". He tries to set the bones of Tom Fry. He gives part of his earnings to 'charity'. He helps the Old Miser to stand during a conversation with the Missourian.
 The Dusk Giant – A kind of invalid Titan in homespun. He violently attacks the Herb-Doctor, proclaiming 'there are pains only death can ease'.
 His child – The daughter of the Dusk Giant is bi-racial.
 Auburn-haired gentleman – Thinks the Herb-Doctor needs unmasking.
 An unhappy-looking woman – sobs after the Herb-Doctor asks if anybody needs charity.
 A man with a hooked nose – Thinks the Herb-Doctor is a fool for giving away some of his earnings to charity.
 A third person with a gossiping expression – Thinks the Herb-Doctor is a 'prowling Jesuit emissary'. 
 Thomas Fry, aka, Happy Tom, the "soldier" – A beggar dressed in grimy old regimental coat. He passes off as a veteran of the Mexican wars, but claims his true story is he was crippled in prison while waiting to testify against a rich murderer. The said murderer got off easily because he had friends, whereas Thomas Fry had no friends and was crippled. After he discovers his brother in Indiana died, he took to begging. Confident his story wouldn't arouse any pity, he fakes a different story.
 Pitch, The Missourian Bachelor – An eccentric, ursine in aspect. He questions the efficiency of the Herb-Doctor's remedies, proclaiming nature brings about many ills, and is not to be trusted: eye problems, destroyed $10,000 of property, threw hail, and shattered windows, He is skeptical of the goodness of humanity and doesn't have confidence in man: "All rascals", most are "knaves or fools". He makes fun of the Old Miser after he is tricked by the Herb-Doctor, argues with the Herb-Doctor about whether nature is good and trustable, then talks about the dishonesty of teenagers with the Agent of the Philosophical Intelligence Office. The latter, however, convinces the Missourian to try hiring a boy at their agency. After the transaction, The Cosmopolitan accosts him, and as he tries to get rid of him, defends his right to be a solitary misanthrope. Throughout the conversation, he shows broad knowledge of "philosophy and books" equal to his obsession with "woodcraft and rifles".
 The Agent of the Philosophical Intelligence Office – A labor-contractor for teenagers. He tries to convince the Missourian Bachelor he should try the services of the Philosophical Intelligence Office. After the latter objects he had enough of teenagers, the agent makes an analogy between a child not having a beard but a beard will grow later, and  a child who hasn't "evinced any noble quality" will yet "sprout" these qualities, "for, have confidence, it, like the beard, is in him". He also likens baby teeth to "corrupt qualities" in "the man-child", and "the sound, even, beautiful permanent" adult teeth to "sound, even, beautiful and permanent virtues". The baby teeth, like the corrupt qualities are "thrust from their place by the independent undergrowth of the succeeding set" of teeth or virtues. He also likens a teenager to a caterpillar, and an adult to "the natural advance of all creatures" - the butterfly. a teenager is like good wine in maturation. Saint Augustine and Ignatius of Loyola are given as examples of virtuous men, rascals in their youth. He succeeds in convincing the Missourian Bachelor to try a fifteen-year-old boy.
 The Cosmopolitan, Francis "Frank" Goodman – A philanthropist, the Cosmopolitan tries to test the ideas of love evoked in the beginning of the book by the Mute, (the references to 1 Corinthians 13), first by arguing with the Missourian one should be warm and confiding with all members of humanity, then by testing the strength of Charlie Nobel's commitment to friendship by asking to borrow money, then by doing the same to the disciple of Mark Winsome, Egbert. The latter test leads to a long debate about whether helping friends leads to an end of their friendship, and if so, how. Finally, the Cosmopolitan convinces the barber momentarily to trust him to pay all the financial losses the barber will accrue for removing the sign "no trust", then does not pay for the shave. In the final chapters, he has a discussion with the Old Man about a warning in the Bible about "an enemy" who "speaketh sweetly in with his lips" but his intention is to tempt, use, and profit from you.
 Charles "Charlie" Arnold Noble – Charlie tells the Cosmopolitan Frank he thinks the Missourian is worse than Colonel John Moredock. Then he tells the story of John Moredock. Then he invites Cosmopolitan Frank to drink together as they discuss the story. Charlie clearly tries to get Frank to drink too much. He agrees to be "best friends" with Frank, but turns cold after Frank reveals he would like to borrow money from him. Frank brings him back to his normal self by performing a ritual.
 Colonel John Moredock – The Indian Hater. He wasted his life taking revenge on Indians for the murder of his family. He is a kind man and a good citizen outside of his revenge sprees.
 Charlemont – The protagonist of the integrated fable told by the Cosmopolitan Frank. He is a young merchant of French descent with many friends. One day, he became morose and unfriendly to everyone, vanishes, and isn't heard from for many years. It appears he was bankrupt, but his strange behavior started several months ago. One day, he comes back, friendly and dressed in expensive clothes. Everybody wondered about events, then one friend asks about them several years later. Charlemont knew his ruin was coming, and didn't want to embarrass his friends into helping him, so he shunned them, and moved to Marseilles (France) so he made his fortune again, then returned, confident he wouldn't embarrass his friends. (The Cosmopolitan Frank stresses there is no moral to this story, it is merely an amusement.)
 Mark Winsome, The mystic Master – a cold restrained. He accosts the Cosmopolitan Frank to warn him Charlie Noble is "an operator". He encourages Frank to think about what it must be like to be a rattlesnake. Then he scares an artist-beggar away with a cold stare. His disciple, Egbert, is the example of following his philosophy.
 Crazy Italian beggar – A haggard seller of a rhapsodical tract. The Cosmopolitan Frank buys his tract and promises to read it. Mark Winsome, the Mystic Master regards him as a scoundrel.
 Egbert – Mark Winsome's disciple. He agrees to do a theoretical exercise with the Cosmopolitan Frank: he pretends to be Frank's "best friend" Charlie Noble, and plays the scene of Frank asking for money. Egbert, following his master's philosophy, gives several reasons for not lending or giving money, and tells the story of China Aster as an illustration.
 China Aster – The protagonist of an integrated fable. He accepts a loan from his friend Orchis with the aim of investing in his business to create more profit. But he doesn't have any business skills, so the money serves to bring about his ruin through unpaid interest on the loan. The devastation is so great, his wife loses her inheritance, his son misses school, and he dies of despair. (The moral of the story -- never accept a loan from a friend.)
 Orchis – China Aster's friend. He wins the lottery, then pushes some of it in the form of a loan on his friend.
 The Old Man – He sits in the middle of the Gentlemen's cabin, awake while others try to sleep, reading the Bible. He discusses the trustworthiness of the Apocrypha with Cosmopolitan Frank. He buys objects from the peddler-boy. He gets a "Counterfeit Detector" as a bonus for buying so much, and tries to use it to see if his banknotes are fake. The Detector is complicated. 
 The man talking in his sleep – A man sleeping in a berth in the Gentlemen's cabin while the Old Man and Cosmopolitan Frank have a discussion. His interjections in his sleep coincide with the subject of the discussion, attributing the quote from The Wisdom of Jesus, Son of Sirach to a description of the confidence man.
 The peddler-boy – A boy dressed in rags sells items for protecting one's money from thieves on a steamer: a traveler's lock, a money belt. His sales technique involves showing the uselessness of the object just purchased to sell the next object. All his customers receive a bonus of a "Counterfeit Detector".

Adaptations
The novel was turned into an opera by George Rochberg; it was premiered by the Santa Fe Opera in 1982, but was not held to be a success.
The 2008 movie The Brothers Bloom, starring Adrien Brody, Mark Ruffalo and Rachel Weisz, borrows some of the plot and makes numerous references to the book: One of the characters is named Melville, the steamer ship is named Fidèle, and the initial mark refers to these coincidences.

References

Sources 
 Milder, Robert. (1988). "Herman Melville." Columbia Literary History of the United States. Gen. Ed. Emory Elliott. New York: Columbia University Press.

External links

 1954 Hendricks House Confidence-Man, online edition edited by Elizabeth S. Foster
 
 
 Critical reaction to and a publishing history of The Confidence-Man: His Masquerade from The Life and Works of Herman Melville
 Online text of the novel from the Electronic Text Center, University of Virginia Library

1857 American novels
Novels by Herman Melville
April Fools' Day
Novels adapted into operas
American satirical novels
American philosophical novels